Current Sociology is a bimonthly peer-reviewed academic journal covering the field of sociology. It is an official journal of the International Sociological Association and is published on their behalf by SAGE Publications It was established in 1952.

Abstracting and indexing 
The journal is abstracted and indexed in Scopus and the Social Sciences Citation Index. According to the Journal Citation Reports, its 2016 impact factor is 1.643, ranking it 32nd out of 142 in the category "Sociology".

References

External links
 
 Journal page on International Sociological Association website

SAGE Publishing academic journals
Bimonthly journals
English-language journals
Publications established in 1952
Sociology journals
Academic journals associated with international learned and professional societies